SS Virawa was a 3,334-ton steamship. She was built for the British-India Steam Navigation Company in 1890. She was one of the early B.I.S.N. ships to use telemotor steering gear.

She was a passenger cargo vessel, also used for the transportation of Indian indentured labourers to the colonies. On 26 April 1895 she arrived in Fiji with 677 indentured Indian labourers on board. She made her second trip to Fiji exactly seven years later, on 26 April 1902 with 718 passengers. Her third trip to Fiji was on 17 July 1905 with 615 passengers and her final trip to Fiji was on 23 March 1907 with 759 passengers. She is also recorded as having transported Indian indentured labourers to Trinidad, arriving on 17 October 1901 with 734 passengers. There were 9 deaths during this voyage.

Virawa was scrapped at Bombay in 1921.

See also 
 Indian Indenture Ships to Fiji
 Indian indenture system

External links

References 

Ships of the British India Steam Navigation Company
Indian indentureship in Trinidad and Tobago
Indian indenture ships to Fiji
Victorian-era passenger ships of the United Kingdom
1890 ships